Vainonen is a Finnish surname. Notable people with the surname include:

Leo Vainonen (born 1952), Swedish boxer
Mikko Vainonen (born 1994), Finnish ice hockey player
Vasili Vainonen (1901–1964), Russian choreographer

Finnish-language surnames